Central Park Plaza is a 15-story, commercial office complex in Downtown Omaha, Nebraska. The complex consists  of office space, in two red brick towers with a lower level center connector on the first and second floors. The building features a central courtyard and a six-story parking garage that is located directly north of the building and is connected by a skywalk. In 2007 a "sunrise" lighting feature was added to the angled face of the towers. The towers, built in a "V" formation, have been central to Omaha's skyline since they were built in the 1980s.

History
Originally built in 1982, the buildings housed the corporate headquarters for Conagra until the company began to move to their new riverfront campus in 1988, and they had completely vacated the buildings by 1990. Over the years the buildings have housed offices for several corporations important to Omaha's economic history including; First National Bank of Omaha, US West, OPPD, Norwest Bank, and the Norchem division of Enron.

In 1983, in an attempt to revitalize retail along 16th Street in downtown, a two-story mall, Parkfair Mall, was added to the west side of Central Park Plaza, across from the J. L. Brandeis and Sons Store Building. The mall closed in the early 1990s and in 2005 the current owners of the building converted the mall into a 125-stall, heated parking facility.

After several corporations relocated their offices to other facilities during the late 1990s and early 2000s, the building's vacancy rate soared as high as 73%. In 2005 FirstComp Insurance company relocated their headquarters to the south tower and after several renovations now occupy the majority of the north tower. As of 2009 FirstComp and their sister company, Rex Risk Exchange, have placed signs on the north and south towers respectively, the first signs on the towers in several years. Also in 2005 the first Starbucks in Downtown Omaha opened in a location on the first floor of the north tower. The first floor of the south tower has an upscale steakhouse, Sullivan's, that opened in 2007. Both locations have outdoor patios in the courtyard added during a $500,000 restoration to the main courtyard in 2005.

References

External links
 Emporis.com
 FirstComp.com

Skyscraper office buildings in Omaha, Nebraska
Office buildings completed in 1982
Modernist architecture in Nebraska